Dendrobium infundibulum, the small-funnel-lipped dendrobium, is a species of orchid. It is native to northern Indochina (Laos, Thailand, Vietnam, Myanmar) and to neighboring parts of China and India (Yunnan and Assam).

References

External links 
  
 

infund
Orchids of Assam
Orchids of Laos
Orchids of Myanmar
Orchids of Thailand
Orchids of Vietnam
Orchids of Yunnan
Plants described in 1859